Adrian Celada is a Filipino professional basketball player. He played college ball for the Arellano Chiefs in the NCAA. He was undrafted in the 2012 PBA draft.

In 2015, the Pacquiao Powervit Pilipinas Aguilas (now the Pilipinas MX3 Kings) of the ABL signed him to play for the team for the 2015–16 season.

In December 2015, Celada, along with Emmerson Oreta, Chad Alonzo, Sunday Salvacion, Jondan Salvador, and Charles Mammie, were released by the Pilipinas MX3 Kings after a roster overhaul by the team. Later in March 2016, Celada signs as the player for Mighty Sports in the Pilipinas Commercial Basketball League.

References

Living people
Small forwards
Filipino men's basketball players
Basketball players from Metro Manila
Arellano Chiefs basketball players
Power forwards (basketball)
Maharlika Pilipinas Basketball League players
Year of birth missing (living people)
Filipino expatriate basketball people in Thailand
Filipino expatriate basketball people in Brunei
Filipino men's 3x3 basketball players